Georges Michel (29 April 1898 – 11 June 1928) was a Belgian footballer. He played in ten matches for the Belgium national football team. This happened between 1919 and 1922.

References

External links
 

1898 births
1928 deaths
Belgian footballers
Belgium international footballers
Place of birth missing
Association football forwards
Léopold FC players